Harry Simpson (1869 – unknown) was a Scottish footballer who played in the Football League for Stoke.

Career
Simpson played for his local club East Stirlingshire when in 1889 he moved down to England to play for Stoke along with teammate Billy Dunn. Simpson played in 12 competitive games and scored 3 goals before returning to Scotland in 1890 to play for Forfar Athletic.

Personal life
He was the uncle of England footballer Jock Simpson and the grandfather of Australia cricketer Bob Simpson.

Career statistics

References

Scottish footballers
Forfar Athletic F.C. players
Stoke City F.C. players
English Football League players
Year of death missing
1869 births
East Stirlingshire F.C. players
Association football wingers